Tenggarong is a town in and the capital of Kutai Kartanegara Regency of East Kalimantan Province, Indonesia. The former Kutai Kartanegara Sultanate's capital was likewise located in Tenggarong.

Historically, the then capital was called Tepian Pandan. At some point, the Kutai Kartanegara Sultan, Aji Muhammad Muslihuddin, changed the name from Tepian Pandan to Tangga Arung (literally house of king). In application, the people of Kutai would then shorten this name by combining the two words Tangga Arung to Tenggarong.

Climate
Tenggarong has a tropical rainforest climate (Af) with heavy rainfall year-round.

References 

Kutai Kartanegara Regency
Populated places in East Kalimantan
Regency seats of East Kalimantan